The Taichung Commercial Bank Headquarters, also known as Taichung Diamond ( or ) is an under construction skyscraper located in Taichung's 7th Redevelopment Zone, Xitun District, Taichung, Taiwan. It will be the tallest building in Taichung and the first building to surpass  in Taichung. It will be completed in 2023 and will become the headquarter of Taichung Bank as well as housing a luxury hotel.

Design 
The architectural design concept is derived from the Taichung Commercial Bank corporate logo with the Chinese character "". Taking the image of the bank, money, gems, and the cornucopia as the main axis, the crystal-like appearance is clear, and the cornucopia is inlaid with the image of shining pearls, which symbolizes the "Diamond of Taichung" and hence its alternative name.

This building avoids the practice of concentrating all large functional areas in a single tower. Therefore, two separate towers are created, with features including a series of "floating" transparent glass boxes are placed in the space between the two towers used for exhibition space, sky gardens, conference facilities, banquet halls, and suspended swimming pools.

Awards
The building has won several international architectural awards:
 2019 Asia Pacific Property Awards: 5-Star, Best Mixed-use Architecture in Taiwan
 2018 World Architecture Festival (WAF) Award: “Commercial Mixed-use – Future Projects” category
 2018 International Design Awards (IDA): Gold, Architecture Category – New Commercial Building
 2018 Architecture MasterPrize: Honorable Mention, Architectural Design Mixed Use Architecture
 2018 MIPIM Awards: Finalist, Best Futura Project
 2017 A' Design Awards: Gold for Architecture, Building and Structural Design

Gallery

See also 
 List of tallest buildings in Taiwan
 List of tallest buildings in Taichung

References

External links
 Commercial Bank Headquarters Mixed-use Project - Aedas

Buildings and structures in Taichung
Buildings and structures under construction in Taiwan
Skyscraper office buildings in Taichung
Taichung's 7th Redevelopment Zone
Skyscraper hotels in Taichung
Postmodern architecture in Taiwan
Bank headquarters in Taiwan